Tanchang, also pronounced Dàngchāng, is a county in the south of Gansu province, China. It is the westernmost county-level division of the prefecture-level city of Longnan. In 2017 its population was 319,400 people.

Administrative divisions
Dangchang County or Tanchang County has 11 towns and 13 townships.

Towns

-Towns are upgraded from Township.

-Towns are established newly.

Townships

-Township is established newly.
 Hejiabao Township()

-Former Townships are merged to other.

Climate

Transport 
China National Highway 212

See also
 Dangxiang 
 List of administrative divisions of Gansu

References

External links
 Official website (Chinese)

County-level divisions of Gansu
Longnan